is a Japanese football player. He currently play for FC Osaka, on loan from Iwaki FC.

Career
After 5 years at youth team, Daigo Furukawa joined the professional contract J2 League club, JEF United Chiba in 2017.

Furukawa loaned to JFL club, Veertien Mie in 2019 for mid season.

Furukawa joined JFL Club, Iwaki FC in 2021. Furukawa brought his club promotion to J3 League for the first time in history from next season and reach JFL Best Eleven. One year later, he brought his club promotion to J2 League after defeat Kagoshima United 3-0 on 5 November 2022, as well as J3 Champions for the first time in history.

On 28 December 2022, Furukawa loaned to J3 promotion club, FC Osaka for upcoming 2023 season.

Career statistics

Club
Updated to the start of 2023 season.

Honours 
 Iwaki FC
 Japan Football League: 2021
 J3 League: 2022

 Individual
 JFL Best Eleven : 2021

References

External links
Profile at JEF United Chiba

1999 births
Living people
Association football people from Chiba Prefecture
Japanese footballers
J2 League players
J3 League players
Japan Football League players
JEF United Chiba players
FC Osaka players
Iwaki FC players
Veertien Mie players
Association football forwards